{{Infobox NFL team
| name                   = Baltimore Colts
| logo                   = Baltimore_Colts_logo_1961-1978.gif
| wordmark               = Indianapolis Colts 2002-2020 wordmark.svg
| established            = 
| ended                  = 
| city                   = Baltimore, Maryland
| misc                   = 
| uniform                = 
| colors                 =   Royal blue, white
| owner                  = Carroll Rosenbloom (1953–1972)Robert Irsay (1972–1983)
| general manager        = 
| coach                  = Keith Molesworth (1953)Weeb Ewbank (1954–1962)Don Shula (1963–1969)Don McCafferty (1970–1972)John Sandusky (1972)Howard Schnellenberger (1973–1974)Joe Thomas (1974)Ted Marchibroda (1975–1979)Mike McCormack (1980–1981)Frank Kush (1982–1983)
| mascot                 = 
| nicknames              = 
| hist_yr                = 1953
| hist_misc2             = 
 Indianapolis Colts (1984–present)
| NFL_start_yr           = 1953
| division_hist          = 
 Western Conference (1953–1969)
 Coastal Division (1967–1969)
 American Football Conference (1970–1983)
 AFC East (1970–1983)
| no_league_champs       = 3†
| no_pre1970sb_champs    = 1
| no_sb_champs           = 1
| no_conf_champs         = 5
| no_div_champs          = 5
| league_champs          = 
 NFL Championships (pre-1970 AFL–NFL merger) (3)1958, 1959, 1968
| sb_champs              = 1970
| conf_champs            = 
 NFL Western: 1958, 1959, 1964, 1968
 AFC: 1970
| div_champs             = 
 NFL Coastal: 1968
 AFC East: 1970, 1975, 1976, 1977
† – Does not include NFL Championships won during the same seasons as the AFL–NFL Super Bowl Championships prior to the 1970 AFL–NFL merger
| playoff_appearances    = 
 NFL: 1958, 1959, 1964, 1965, 1968, 1970, 1971, 1975, 1976, 1977
| no_playoff_appearances = 10
| stadium_years          = 
 Memorial Stadium (1953–1983)
}}

The Baltimore Colts''' were a professional American football team that played in Baltimore from its founding in 1953 to 1984. The team now plays in Indianapolis, as the Indianapolis Colts. The team was named for Baltimore's history of horse breeding and racing. It was the second incarnation of the Baltimore Colts, the first having played for three years in the All-America Football Conference and one in the National Football League (NFL). This Baltimore Colts team played its home games at Memorial Stadium.

Franchise history
The Baltimore Colts were one of the first NFL teams to have cheerleaders, a marching band and a team "fight song" (along with the nearby Washington Redskins, forty miles southwest in the nation's capital). The Baltimore Colts were named after Baltimore's long-running annual Preakness Stakes, a premier thoroughbred horse racing event, and the second jewel of the famous Triple Crown championship series of the sport run at the historic Pimlico Race Course every May since 1873.

This third, most famous Baltimore Colts pro football franchise was officially created in 1953, but can trace its history much earlier than this, to before the NFL itself actually began in 1920: its earliest predecessor was the old Dayton Triangles, a founding member of the reorganized and renamed National Football League of 1922 (from the old previous American Professional Football Conference, later renamed A.P.F. Association a few months later in 1920) that was originally created in 1913.

Because of this link to the Dayton Triangles, the Baltimore Colts can arguably claim to have played and won, on October 3, 1920, what could be considered the very first A.P.F.A./N.F.L. professional football game, with a 14–0 defeat of the rival Columbus Panhandles at Triangle Park in Dayton, Ohio. The team went through the following changes:

 Dayton Triangles pro football team relocated to New York City to the Borough of Brooklyn, New York and was renamed Brooklyn Dodgers (separate from the more famous Brooklyn Dodgers of major league baseball's National League) in 1930.
 Changed name to Brooklyn Tigers in 1944; in the same year, the Boston Yanks are founded.
 Merged with Boston Yanks in 1945 as the World War II-era war-time "The Yanks".
 The Brooklyn franchise was canceled in 1945 by the League and the team's players were given to the Boston Yanks, as a parallel team, the (New York Yankees of the new competing post-war All-America Football Conference - A.A.F.C.) was founded by the Tigers' former owner, Dan Topping.
 The Miami Seahawks of the A.A.F.C. were shut down and replaced in the Conference's second season by a new franchise in Baltimore given the name of the "Colts" after a name selection contest among the new Baltimore fans. The Colts later joined the reorganized NFL in 1950, following the merger of the A.A.F.C. with the older league, along with the addition of teams San Francisco 49ers and the Cleveland Browns. This second Baltimore Colts franchise was later dissolved by the NFL for financial reasons after only the one 1950 season on January 18, 1951.
 The Boston Yanks were canceled upon request of the team owner for tax purposes. The owner was given a new franchise for New York City in 1949, now named the New York Bulldogs. The name was then changed to the New York Yanks the following season in 1950, and absorbed much of the previous football Yankees' roster the next year.
 The New York Yanks of the NFL were shut down after the one 1951 season and replaced in 1952 by the Dallas Texans, with the first expansion of the League into high school and collegiate football-crazy Texas and first into the southern part of the United States.
 The Texans owner returned the team leadership to the League ownership of the NFL during mid-season. The Texans become a "road" team halfway through the 1952 season with no "home base", playing only "away" games and folded after the one 1952 season.

The Dallas Texans franchise was returned to the league November 14, 1952, and after they couldn't find a buyer for the team, the franchise was cancelled. The NFL now had a space in their calendar, and awarded a new franchise to the Colts in January 1953.

To date, the NFL's records consider the Colts to be a 1953 expansion team; it does not consider the Colts to be a continuation of the Triangles/Dodgers/Tigers/Yanks/Bulldogs/Yanks/Texans franchise, despite the assets of the franchise never missing a season in some form.

AAFC Baltimore Colts
As the result of a fan contest in Baltimore, won by Charles Evans of Middle River in suburban eastern Baltimore County, the team was renamed the "Baltimore Colts". On September 7, 1947, wearing the green and silver uniforms, the Colts, under Head Coach Cecil Isbell, won their initial All-America Football Conference game in the A.A.F.C.'s second season, 16–7, over the Brooklyn Dodgers. Home site for the new AAFC games in "The Monumental City" was the old 1922 Municipal Stadium (also known as "Baltimore Stadium" or "Venable Stadium" - located in previous Venable Park) on the north side of 33rd Street boulevard in northeast Baltimore, later renovated and rebuilt with an upper tier added the following year for use also by the new American League of major league baseball's relocated franchise, the Baltimore Orioles). The football team concluded its inaugural season before a record Baltimore crowd of 51,583 by losing to the New York Yankees, 21–7. The Colts finished with a 2–11–1 record, good for a fourth-place finish in the Eastern Division of the A.A.F.C. The Colts completed the 1948 season with a 7–8 record, tying the Buffalo Bills for the division title. The Colts compiled a 1–11 mark in their third season of 1949. Y. A. Tittle, later to gain Hall of Fame status a decade later with the NFL's New York Giants, was the Colts starting quarterback.

After four years of inter-league rivalry, competition, and player contract raiding, the A.A.F.C. and N.F.L. merged in 1950, and the Colts joined the reorganized new NFL, along with the San Francisco 49ers and the Cleveland Browns. After posting a 1–11 record for the second consecutive year, the NFL franchise of just one season was dissolved by the League on January 18, 1951. But many Baltimore fans protested the loss of their team and continued to support the marching band (the second in professional football, after that of the Washington Redskins) and fan club, both of which remained in operation ("in exile" status) and worked for the team's revival.

NFL Dallas Texans
After two seasons without professional football, NFL Commissioner Bert Bell challenged the City of Baltimore under Mayor Thomas L. J. D'Alesandro Jr., in December 1952 to sell 15,000 season tickets within six weeks in order to re-enter the NFL. That 15,000-ticket quota was reached in just four weeks and three days.

On January 23, 1953, with the encouragement of the city's civic and business leadership, under the principal ownership of Carroll Rosenbloom, the NFL sold the assets of the defunct Dayton Triangles-Dallas Texans franchise to Baltimore where, keeping the "Colts" nickname, the Triangles-Texans team colors of blue and white were used. This is the franchise that exists today in Indianapolis in the modern National Football League.

In Baltimore

1953–1967: Johnny Unitas era

In 1953, the second incarnation of the Baltimore Colts took the field for the first time ever at Memorial Stadium (then also used temporarily by the old Baltimore Orioles minor league team in the International League since the burning in July 1944 of their Oriole Park home farther southeast at Greenmount Avenue and 29th Street in Waverly). The stadium was being rebuilt and adding a second upper tier to old Municipal Stadium for use by the following year of Major League Baseball's Baltimore Orioles franchise in the American League, relocated that November from St. Louis, Missouri as the St. Louis Browns. The 33rd Street field also then sometimes known as "Baltimore Stadium" or "Venable Stadium" for its location in the former Venable Park along the north side of the 33rd Street boulevard, constructed originally as a football-only bowl in 1922 in only seven months and later capable of holding almost 100,000 fans for the frequent high school and local collegiate/university games there during the following three decades), on September 27 to face off against the Chicago Bears. The Colts would go on to win the game 13–9 and stun the Bears. The team's lack of experience showed as the team finished 3–9. In 1955, the Colts had 12 rookies make the team. In 1956, quarterback George Shaw went down with a serious injury in the fourth game of the season. The Colts' unproven backup, Johnny Unitas, would go on to win half the remaining eight games to give the Colts a record of 5–7 for the season.

The Colts won their first NFL Championship in 1958. The 1958 NFL Championship game is widely known as the "Greatest Game Ever Played" for its dramatic conclusion with quarterback Johnny Unitas marching the Colts downfield in sudden death overtime and Alan Ameche scoring the winning touchdown on a 1-yard run. Much of the credit for Baltimore's success went to Hall of Famers Johnny Unitas, halfback Lenny Moore, and wide receiver Raymond Berry.

Following the Colts' first NFL championship, the team once again posted a 9–3 record during the 1959 season and once again defeated the Giants in the NFL Championship Game to claim their second title in back to back fashion. Following the two championships in 1958 and 1959, the Colts did not return to the NFL Championship for four seasons and saw a transition from head coach Ewbank to a young Don Shula in 1963. In Shula's second season the Colts compiled a 12–2 record, but lost 27–0 to the Cleveland Browns in the NFL Championship. In 1965 the Colts played the Green Bay Packers in a playoff to determine who would go to the NFL Championship game. The Colts were leading 10–7 over the Green Bay Packers with two minutes left to play when the Packers' kicker, Don Chandler seemed to barely miss a field goal. The referee called it good and the Packers went on to win the game in overtime. The error precipitated changes to the rules: the NFL decided two referees would judge future field goals, and that the uprights should be raised by ten feet. In 1968 the Colts returned with the continued leadership of Unitas and Shula and went on to win the Colts' third NFL Championship and made an appearance in Super Bowl III. In 1968, Unitas was injured and replaced by Earl Morrall who became the league's MVP.

1968–1972: Merger and Super Bowl V

Leading up to the Super Bowl and following the 34–0 trouncing of the Cleveland Browns in the NFL Championship, many were calling the 1968 Colts team one of the "greatest pro football teams of all time" and were favored by 18 points against their counterparts from the American Football League, the New York Jets. The Colts were stunned by the Jets, who won the game 16–7 in the first Super Bowl victory for the young AFL. The result of the game surprised many in the sports media as Joe Namath and Matt Snell led the Jets to the Super Bowl victory under head coach Weeb Ewbank, who had previously won two NFL Championships with the Colts.

Rosenbloom of the Colts, Art Modell of the Browns, and Art Rooney of the Pittsburgh Steelers agreed to have their teams join the ten AFL teams in the AFC as part of the AFL–NFL merger in 1970. The Colts immediately went on a rampage in the new league, as new head coach Don McCafferty led the 1970 team to an 11–2–1 regular-season record, winning the AFC East title. In the first round of the NFL Playoffs, the Colts beat the Cincinnati Bengals 17–0; one week later in the first-ever AFC Championship Game, they beat the Oakland Raiders 27–17. Baltimore went on to win the first post-merger Super Bowl (Super Bowl V), defeating the NFC's Dallas Cowboys 16–13 on a Jim O'Brien field goal with five seconds left to play. The victory gave the Colts their fourth NFL championship and first Super Bowl victory. Following the championship, the Colts returned to the playoffs in 1971, winning their opening playoff game against the Browns 20–3, but lost in the second AFC Championship Game in Miami 21–0.

1972–1976: Bob Irsay arrives
Citing friction with the City of Baltimore and the local press, Rosenbloom traded the Colts franchise to Robert Irsay on July 13, 1972, and received the Los Angeles Rams in return. Under the new ownership, the Colts did not reach the postseason for three consecutive seasons after 1971, and after the 1972 season, starting quarterback and legend Johnny Unitas was traded to the San Diego Chargers. Following Unitas' departure, the Colts made the playoffs three consecutive seasons from 1975 to 1977, losing in the divisional round each time. The Colts' 1977 playoff loss in double overtime against the Oakland Raiders was famous for the fact that it was the last playoff game for the Colts in Baltimore and is also known for the Ghost to the Post play. These consecutive playoff teams featured 1976 NFL Most Valuable Player Bert Jones at quarterback and an outstanding defensive line, nicknamed the "Sack Pack."

1976–1983: Last days
Following this relative success in the 1970s, the Colts suffered a string of disappointing seasons, often finishing in last place in their division. Attendance began to dwindle in the early 1970s and remained that way for the rest of the team's tenure in Baltimore. The Colts would endure nine consecutive losing seasons beginning in 1978. In 1981, the Colts defense allowed an NFL-record 533 points, set an all-time record for fewest sacks (13), and also set a modern record for fewest punt returns (12). The following year, the offense collapsed, including a game against the Buffalo Bills where the Colts' offense did not cross mid-field the entire game. The Colts finished 0–8–1 in the strike-shortened 1982 season, thereby earning the right to select Stanford quarterback John Elway with the first overall pick. Elway refused to play for Baltimore, and using leverage as a draftee of the New York Yankees baseball club, forced a trade to Denver. Behind an improved defense the team finished 7–9 in 1983, but that would be their last season in Baltimore.

Move to Indianapolis

The city of Indianapolis, Indiana, made an offer for the Colts franchise to move there. Baltimore was unsuccessful at persuading them to stay, so the city government attempted to get the state legislature to condemn the Colts franchise and give ownership to another group that would promise to keep the Colts in Baltimore. Oakland, California had just had some success in court trying the same tactic with the Oakland Raiders. Under the threat of eminent domain from the city of Baltimore, the franchise relocated to Indianapolis in the middle of the night on March 29, 1984.

The city of Baltimore did not give up and sued to condemn the franchise anyway and seize ownership. Baltimore did not prevail in court, but eventually acquired a new NFL team in 1996 with the establishment of the Baltimore Ravens following the Cleveland Browns relocation controversy.

Many former Colts players were infuriated by the move. Among the most notable was Johnny Unitas, who opted to cut all ties with his former team after the incident. Unitas aligned himself with the Ravens when they moved to Baltimore, and a statue of him was placed outside of M&T Bank Stadium. On the other hand, Colts owner Jim Irsay held a reunion for the 1975 AFC East champion Baltimore Colts in Indianapolis at Lucas Oil Stadium in 2009. 39 of the 53 members of that team attended the ceremony, including Bert Jones, Lydell Mitchell, and Mike Curtis.

Continuity
The NFL treats the Baltimore Colts and the Indianapolis Colts (including logos, history, and records) as one continuous franchise since 1953. Despite this, many former Baltimore Colts players, led by Johnny Unitas, disowned the Colts franchise after the move to Indianapolis, instead choosing to remain loyal to the City of Baltimore. These former players embraced the new Baltimore Ravens franchise when it arrived in Baltimore in 1996. The Ravens do claim the history of the Baltimore Colts as part of their own and have added the Baltimore Colt Hall of Famers to the Baltimore Ravens Ring of Honor. The Ravens officially have no retired numbers, but out of respect for Unitas, only quarterback Scott Mitchell has worn the number 19, which he did in his lone season in Baltimore in 1999. The Baltimore Colts Marching Band, which continued to operate after the Colts moved, became Baltimore's Marching Ravens.

On the other hand, there have been many former Baltimore Colts players who have embraced the franchise as continuous, from Baltimore to Indianapolis. In 2009, Jim Irsay held a reunion of his favorite Colts team ever, the 1975 AFC East champions. Thirty-nine of the 50 players on that roster attended the reunion at Lucas Oil Stadium, including quarterback Bert Jones and running back Lydell Mitchell. Also, On February 5, 2012, at Super Bowl XLVI, Hall-of-Fame Baltimore Colts wide receiver Raymond Berry carried the Vince Lombardi Trophy to midfield to present it to the New York Giants, who had just defeated the New England Patriots. He was given the honor due to the game being played at Lucas Oil Stadium, where the Colts have played since 2008.

Although the retired numbers of the Indianapolis Colts officially includes Unitas and others dating back to the Baltimore days, the Indianapolis Colts Ring of Honor currently only includes players who have played in Indianapolis, with the exception of Chris Hinton, who played for the Baltimore Colts in his rookie season in 1983.

Records

All-time records

Retired numbers
Includes Players That ONLY Played in Baltimore

Pro Football Hall of Famers

Notes
The Finish, Won, Lost, and Ties columns list regular season results and exclude any postseason play. Regular season and postseason results are combined only at the bottom of the list.
All regular season MVPs listed are the Associated Press MVP. For the full list of other MVPs see National Football League Most Valuable Player Award.
All Coach of the Year Awards listed are the Associated Press award. For the full list of other coaching awards see National Football League Coach of the Year Award.
This game would be later known as The Greatest Game Ever Played.
The 1967 NFL season marks the first season in the league's history where the league was divided into two conferences which were subdivided into two divisions. Up to 1967, the league was either divided into two divisions, two conferences, or neither.
The Colts and Dolphins finished tied. However, the Colts finished ahead of Miami in the AFC East based on a head-to-head sweep (2–0).
The Colts and Patriots finished tied. However, the Colts finished ahead of New England based on a better division record (7–1 to Patriots' 6–2).
The Colts and Dolphins finished tied. However, the Colts finished ahead of Miami based on better conference record (9–3 to Dolphins' 8–4).
The game involved the infamous Ghost to the Post play.
1982 was a strike-shortened season so the league was divided up into two conferences instead of its normal divisional alignment.

References

Baltimore Colts
C
B